Zachery George Aley (born 17 August 1991) is a semi-professional footballer who plays for City of Liverpool as a midfielder. He played in the English Football League with Morecambe.

Football career
Aley progressed through non-League club Southport's youth system before breaking into the first team, scoring on his league debut against Farsley Celtic. He gained BTECs and NVQs, as well as becoming a qualified referee whilst with the club. He signed for Premier League club Blackburn Rovers in March 2010, after a two-day trial.

He joined League Two club, Morecambe on loan for a month on 18 March 2011. Aley made his debut for Morecambe on 22 March, in the 2–1 home defeat against Macclesfield Town when he came on as a substitute for Kevan Hurst in the 75th minute.

Aley re-joined Conference National side Southport on an initial one-month loan on 21 October 2011. He went out on loan again at the end of that season, this time at Macclesfield Town. In the summer of 2012 Zac was released by Blackburn Rovers, Aley went on trial with Southport. On 14 September 2012, he joined Northern Premier League side Warrington Town on a free transfer, but left the club less than two months later in November 2012 by mutual consent. On 9 November 2012, Zac signed with Ashton Town in the North West Counties Football League. In October 2016, he signed for Runcorn Linnets. In December 2020, Aley signed for City of Liverpool.

Club career statistics

References

External links
Blackburn Rovers profile
Morecambe profile

Living people
1991 births
English footballers
Southport F.C. players
Blackburn Rovers F.C. players
Morecambe F.C. players
Macclesfield Town F.C. players
Warrington Town F.C. players
Ashton Town A.F.C. players
English Football League players
National League (English football) players
Northwich Victoria F.C. players
Skelmersdale United F.C. players
Association football midfielders
City of Liverpool F.C. players
Northern Premier League players